Sweden participated in the Junior Eurovision Song Contest 2013 in Kyiv, Ukraine. The Swedish entry was selected through Lilla Melodifestivalen 2013 which consisted of eight songs. The final was held on 6 June 2013 at the Gröna Lund amusement park in Stockholm. Eliias and his song "Det är dit vi ska" was chosen as the winner.

Before Junior Eurovision

Selection procedure
On 1 March 2013, SVT announced that a Lilla Melofifestivalen 2013 would be held to select Sweden's entry for the Junior Eurovision Song Contest 2013. A submission period for interested artists was opened and lasted until 27 March 2013. A professional jury selected eight artists and songs from the applicants to proceed to the Lilla Melodifestivalen 2013.

The selected artists and songs competed at the Lilla Melodifestivalen 2013 which took place on 6 June 2013 at the Gröna Lund amusement park in Stockholm, hosted by Behrang Miri and Kim Ohlsson. The members of the jury were Christer Björkman, Carolina Noren and Jan Lundqvist.

Final

On 6 June 2013, Elias Elffors Elfström went on to win Lilla Melodifestivalen, the Swedish national selection for the Junior Eurovision Song Contest with his song "Det är dit vi ska." Five months later, he shot a music video for the song, and changed his stage name to Eliias.  On 30 November 2013, Eliias went to represent his country at the 11th annual Junior Eurovision Song Contest.  "Det är dit vi ska" placed 9th in a field of 12 songs, receiving 46 points.

Participant biography

Elias

Elias Elffors Elfström (also mononymously known as Eliias) was born on 5 June 2000 in Nacka, part of the Swedish capital city Stockholm.  He has been interested in music for most of his life and started singing from an early age.  Elfström recorded a couple of original songs as well.  In 2011, he recorded a song called "Mr. Hopeless," which he wrote himself.  Other original songs include "Higher," "Our Star," and "Warrior." Eliias wrote and recorded a new song in February 2014, however, the title was never mentioned on his official website. He was also chosen to announce the points for Sweden at the Junior Eurovision Song Contest 2014 in Malta.

At Junior Eurovision 
During the allocation draw on 25 November 2013, Sweden was drawn to open the show, performing 1st, preceding Azerbaijan. Sweden placed 9th, scoring 46 points.

The members of Swedish jury were Samuel Andersson, Gabriella Benno, Gustav Dahlander, Max Gullström, Ayla Kabaca and Marie Olofsson. The Swedish member of the children's international jury was Maia Ljusberg.

In Sweden, show were broadcast on SVT Barnkanalen with commentary by Ylva Hällen and Edward af Sillén. The Swedish spokesperson revealing the result of the Swedish vote was Lova Sönnerbo.

Voting

Notes

References

Junior Eurovision Song Contest
Sweden
2013